Orechová Potôň is a village and municipality in the Dunajská Streda District in the Trnava Region of south-west Slovakia.

History
In historical records the village was first mentioned in 1250. Until the end of World War I, it was part of Hungary and fell within the Dunaszerdahely district of Pozsony County. After the Austro-Hungarian army disintegrated in November 1918, Czechoslovakian troops occupied the area. After the Treaty of Trianon of 1920, the village became officially part of Czechoslovakia. In November 1938, the First Vienna Award granted the area to Hungary and it was held by Hungary until 1945. After Soviet occupation in 1945, Czechoslovakian administration returned and the village became officially part of Czechoslovakia in 1947.

Geography
The municipality lies at an altitude of 120 metres and covers an area of 21.069 km². It has a population of about 1,732 people. According to the census of 2001, the village had a population of 1,671, from which 1,573 were Hungarians and 99 Slovaks.

Motorsport
Automotodróm Slovakia Ring, the largest racing circuit in Slovakia, is located in Orechová Potôň. It was built between 2008 and 2009, and had since then hosted several major motorsport events, such as FIA World Touring Car Championship and FIA GT1 World Championship rounds.

References

External links
 
 Official webpage of Reformed church in Orechová Potôň (Diósförgepatony)

Villages and municipalities in Dunajská Streda District
Hungarian communities in Slovakia